John William Fuhrer (April 11, 1880 – July 24, 1972) was an American football and basketball coach. He served as the head football coach at Doane College from 1904 to 1907 and Kansas State Teachers College of Pittsburg—referred to commonly at the time as Pittsburg Normal and now known as Pittsburg State University–from 1909 to 1914 and again in 1918, compiling a career college football coaching record of 39–33–2. Fuhrer was also the head basketball coach at Pittsburg Normal from 1909 to 1914, tallying a mark of 21–20. He also competed at the 1904 Summer Olympics.

Athletic career
Fuhrer competed in the men's triple jump at the 1904 Summer Olympics, where he placed fourth.

Coaching career

Doane
Fuhrer was the tenth head football coach at Doane College in Crete, Nebraska and he held that position for four seasons, from 1904 until 1907. His coaching record at Doane was 13–11.

In 1971, a gymnasium at Doane College was named after Fuhrer, with him present at the dedication.

Pittsburg State
Fuhrer was the second head football coach at Kansas State Teachers College of Pittsburg—referred to commonly at the time as Pittsburg Normal and now known as Pittsburg State University–in Pittsburg, Kansas. He coached from 1909 through 1914, and then returned for the 1918 season for a total of seven seasons. His teams posted a record of 26–22–2.

On November 27, 1913 in a game against the Southwestern Moundbuilders coached by Fred Clapp, Fuhrer officially launched a formal protest against the appearance of an African American player.

Lincoln Y.M.C.A.
Fuhrer moved to Lincoln, Nebraska in 1919 to serve as physical director of the Lincoln Y.M.C.A.

Death
Fuhrer died on July 24, 1972, aged 92.

Head coaching record

Football

References

1880 births
1972 deaths
American male triple jumpers
Athletes (track and field) at the 1904 Summer Olympics
Basketball coaches from Illinois
Doane Tigers football coaches
Doane Tigers football players
Olympic track and field athletes of the United States
People from Hancock County, Illinois
Pittsburg State Gorillas football coaches
Pittsburg State Gorillas men's basketball coaches
Players of American football from Illinois